The  is an archaeological site containing the ruins of a final Kofun period to early Nara period necropolis in what is now part of the city of Izunokuni, Shizuoka, in the Tōkai region of Japan. The site was designated a National Historic Site of Japan in 1976, wth the area under protection expanded in 1985.

Overview
The Kitaema site is north of the city center of Izunokuni on the banks of the Kano River. The site consists of ten  with burial chambers excavated into the side of a tuff hill to the west (the "Daishiyama group") and a second set of more than 40 tombs to the east (the "Daihoku" group), and includes stone house-shaped sarcophagus made from hollowed-out stone. The graves indicate a period of transition between burial and cremation.  

One grave contained a 1200-year-old stone coffin shaped like a house and inscribed "Wakato-nari", which was presumably the name of the person associated with the tomb. This coffin was designated a National Important Cultural Property in 1993. The National Historic Site designation was expanded due to additional finds in 1985. 

The site is approximately 15 minutes by foot from Izu Hakone Railway's Izu-Nagaoka Station.

Gallery

See also
List of Historic Sites of Japan (Shizuoka)

References

External links

Izu Geopark official site 
Izunokuni tourist information page 

Kofun period
History of Shizuoka Prefecture
Izunokuni
Archaeological sites in Japan
Historic Sites of Japan